The Klimov GTD-350 (initially Isotov GTD-350) is a Soviet gas-turbine turboshaft engine intended for helicopter use. Designed in the early 1960s by the Isotov Design Bureau the engine was later produced by Klimov and PZL, production ending in the late 1990s.

The GTD-350 powers the Mil Mi-2, the first Soviet gas-turbine powered helicopter, and has accumulated over 20 million hours in service.

Applications
 Mil Mi-2

Specifications (GTD-350)

See also

References

1960s turboshaft engines
GTD-350